Ben Kieckhefer (born 1977) is an American politician who has served as the chief of staff to Nevada governor Joe Lombardo since 2023. A member of the Republican Party, Kieckhefer previously served as a member of the Nevada Gaming Commission from 2021 to 2023 and as a member of the Nevada Senate from the 16th district from 2010 to 2021.

Born and raised in Illinois, Kieckhefer holds degrees from DePaul University and the University of Illinois Springfield. After college, he worked as a journalist covering the Nevada Legislature for the Associated Press and the Reno Gazette-Journal. He served as communications director for Nevada governor Jim Gibbons and as the public information officer for the Nevada Department of Health and Human Services. He was also director of client relations for McDonald Carano, a Reno-based law firm.

In 2010, Kieckhefer was elected to the Nevada Senate. During his time in the state senate, Kieckhefer served as assistant Republican leader from 2013 to 2018. He resigned in 2021 after Steve Sisolak appointed him to the Nevada Gaming Commission.

After Lombardo defeated Sisolak in 2022, Kieckhefer was named as Lombardo's chief of staff. He resigned from the Nevada Gaming Commission to accept the appointment and was succeeded by former lieutenant governor Brian Krolicki.

Kieckhefer lives in Reno with his wife and four children.

References 

1977 births
Republican Party Nevada state senators
Living people
Politicians from Reno, Nevada
Politicians from Springfield, Illinois
DePaul University alumni
21st-century American politicians